Chan Kai Sang (born 23 December 1958) is a Hong Kong former fencer. He competed in the individual and team épée events at the 1988 Summer Olympics.

References

External links
 

1958 births
Living people
Hong Kong male épée fencers
Olympic fencers of Hong Kong
Fencers at the 1988 Summer Olympics
Fencers at the 1986 Asian Games
Fencers at the 1990 Asian Games
Asian Games competitors for Hong Kong